Streptomyces helvaticus is a bacterium species from the genus of Streptomyces.

See also 
 List of Streptomyces species

References

Further reading

External links
Type strain of Streptomyces helvaticus at BacDive -  the Bacterial Diversity Metadatabase

helvaticus
Bacteria described in 1970